Nix on Dames is a 1929 American pre-Code comedy film directed by Donald Gallaher and written by Maude Fulton and Frank Gay. The film stars Mae Clarke, Robert Ames, William Harrigan, Maude Fulton, George MacFarlane and Frederick H. Graham. The film was released on November 24, 1929, by Fox Film Corporation.

Cast 
Mae Clarke as Jackie Lee
Robert Ames as Bert Wills
William Harrigan as Johnny Brown
Maude Fulton as Stella Foster
George MacFarlane as Ed Foster
Frederick H. Graham as Baring
Camille Rovelle s Miss Woods
Grace Wallace as Bonnie Tucker
Hugh McCormack as Jim Tucker
Ben Hall as Cliff
Marshall Ruth as Billy
William Colvin as Hoffman
Louise Beavers as Magnolia

References

External links

1929 films
1920s English-language films
Fox Film films
Silent American comedy films
1929 comedy films
American black-and-white films
Films directed by Donald Gallaher
1920s American films